The green circle is a regional nature reserve (zakaznik) located in Crimea, a territory internationally recognised as part of Ukraine but occupied by Russia since 2014.

Description 
The green circle is located in the Kerch Peninsula. Including pine, ash, maple, and honey locust trees, among others, the green circle was established as a reforestation initiative on the relatively treeless Pontic–Caspian steppe. It is located within the urban-type settlement of Lenine. On 20 May 1980, the Cabinet of Ministers of the Ukrainian SSR recognised the green circle as a regional nature reserve.

According to plans, green corridors will be provided for to prevent environmental destruction caused by the Tavrida Highway's construction.

References 

Protected areas established in 1980
Urban forests of Ukraine
Urban forests in Russia